Mecas ambigena is a species of longhorn beetles found in Mexico. It was described by Henry Walter Bates in 1881.

References

Saperdini
Beetles described in 1881